Jarom Wagoner is the mayor of Caldwell, Idaho. He was a member of the Caldwell City Council, and a former Republican member of Idaho House of Representatives from District 10, seat A.

Early life 
Wagoner was born in Rexburg, Idaho.

Education 
Wagoner first attended Brigham Young University–Idaho, and later attended Arizona State University where he earned a degree in business administration, finance, and economics.

Career 
In 2005, Wagoner became a city planner for County Development Services, until 2009. In 2009, Wagoner became a Principal Planner for JP Wagoner Planning, until 2010. In 2010, Wagoner became a Planner for Ada County Highway District, until 2013. In July 2013, Wagoner became a senior planner for the City of Caldwell, Idaho.

Appointment and Elections

Mayor of Caldwell 
Wagoner was one of five candidates running for Caldwell, Idaho Mayor in the November 2021 election. Wagoner even though he was the highest vote getting with 47% of the vote, Caldwell requires the mayoral race to win with more than 50% making Wagoner face John McGee on the November 30, 2021 run off election. McGee attempted to drop out and allow Wagnoner to become mayor without a run off election but the city clerk said that the run off election must happen.John McGee did not actively campaign in the run off election. Wagoner defeated McGee with 82.75% of the vote.

Idaho House of Representatives District 10, Seat A 
In November 2017, Wagoner was appointed by Idaho Governor Butch Otter to become a Republican member of Idaho House of Representatives for District 10, seat A. Wagnoner replaced Brandon Hixon, who resigned on October 19, 2017 from the Idaho House of Representatives.

2020 
Wagoner was defeated by Julie Yamamoto in the Republican primary, gaining only 41.73% of the vote.

2018 
Wagoner was unopposed in the Republican primary. Wagoner defeated Democratic nominee Sead Muradbegovic with 63.3% of the vote.

2012 
Wagoner challenged Brandon Hixon in the Republican primary, he lost taking only 48.5% of the vote. (85 votes)

Personal life 
Wagoner and his wife Lisa reside in Caldwell, Idaho. They have three children.

References

External links 
 Jarom Wagoner at ballotpedia.org

Year of birth missing (living people)
Living people
People from Caldwell, Idaho
Arizona State University alumni
American urban planners
Republican Party members of the Idaho House of Representatives
21st-century American politicians